This is a list of units in the New Zealand Cadet Corps.

Each unit is led and managed by the Cadet Unit Commander, and their officers and staff.

There are currently 33 New Zealand Cadet Corps units in New Zealand.

Former Units

Former School Cadet Units

See also 
New Zealand Cadet Corps

New Zealand Cadet Forces

References

Cadet Corps
New Zealand Cadet Corps
Cadet Corps units